Uras may refer to:

People
 Ali Uras (1923–2012), Turkish basketball player
 Cédric Uras (born 1977), French football player
 Güngör Uras (1933–2018), Turkish economist, journalist, academician and author
 Onur Uras (born 1985), Turkish olympic swimmer
 Ufuk Uras (born 1959), Turkish politician and economist

Places
 Uras, Sardinia, village in the Province of Oristano, Italy

Other
 Uras (mythology) or Urash, in Sumerian religion, goddess of earth, and one of the consorts of the sky god Anu